Bueb is a surname. Notable people with this surname include:

 Franz Bueb (1912–1982), German painter
 Ivor Bueb (1923–1959), British driver